George Graeme (1565–1643), Bishop of Dunblane and Bishop of Orkney, was a late sixteenth- and early seventeenth century Church of Scotland prelate.

Life

He was the younger son of George Grahame Laird of Inchbraikie and his wife, Marion ("Mary") Rollo, daughter of Rollo of Duncrub. He was a great-grandson of William Graham, 1st Earl of Montrose. 

Originally (from 1589) minister of Clunie he translated to Auchtergaven in 1595 and further translated to Scone in 1601, and then in February 1603, he received crown provision to the bishopric of Dunblane, vacant by the resignation of Andrew Graham. George had to wait a few years to obtain consecration, but was consecrated at some date between 21 October 1610 and 3 May 1611.

On 26 August 1615, he was translated to the bishopric of Orkney. He held that bishopric for more than three decades. Graeme, along with all other bishops of Scotland, was deprived of his see on 18 November 1638. He renounced his rights to the bishopric a few months later, on 11 February 1639, after being threatened by the Assembly at Glasgow. By this action, he avoided excommunication, and retained his estate at Gorthie. He died on 19 December 1643.

Family

In 1595, he married Marion Crichton, sister of The Admirable James Crichton. Marion was the daughter of Sir Robert Crichton of Eliock and Cluny, Perthshire, Lord Advocate of Scotland, and his wife Elizabeth Stewart, granddaughter of Andrew Stewart, 2nd Lord Avondale. They were the parents of at least seven children, five of whom survived to adulthood.

References

 Keith, Robert, An Historical Catalogue of the Scottish Bishops: Down to the Year 1688, (London, 1924), pp. 181, 227
 

1643 deaths
Bishops of Dunblane
Bishops of Orkney
16th-century births
17th-century bishops of the Church of Scotland
Members of the Parliament of Scotland 1612
Members of the Convention of the Estates of Scotland 1617
Members of the Parliament of Scotland 1617
Members of the Parliament of Scotland 1628–1633